In number theory, the unit function is a completely multiplicative function on the positive integers defined as:

It is called the unit function because it is the identity element for Dirichlet convolution.

It may be described as the "indicator function of 1" within the set of positive integers.  It is also written as u(n) (not to be confused with μ(n), which generally denotes the Möbius function).

See also
 Möbius inversion formula
 Heaviside step function
 Kronecker delta

References

Multiplicative functions
1 (number)